"Dāvāja Māriņa meitenei mūžiņu" is a Latvian song composed by Raimonds Pauls with lyrics by Leons Briedis. It was performed at the 1981 Mikrofona aptauja by Aija Kukule and Līga Kreicberga.

The song is one of Pauls's most popular ones. It has been covered by several artists, most notably by Russian Alla Pugacheva in 1982 with lyrics by Andrei Voznesensky as "Million Scarlet Roses" (Million alykh roz).

Alla Pugacheva cover 
Pugacheva's cover was written by Andrei Voznesensky as "Million Scarlet Roses" (Миллион алых роз, Million alykh roz), and Voznesensky drew inspiration for the Russian lyrics from the life of Georgian painter Niko Pirosmani who allegedly once filled with flowers a square of a hotel where Marguerite de Sèvres, a French actress whom he had affection over was staying. The song is also the opening and title track of Pugacheva's album of the same name released in Japan in 1983.

Charts

Other covers

Recordings 
Numerous further covers are lyrically based on Andrei Voznesensky lyrics (the cover by Alla Pugacheva):
 1984: Finnish singer Vera Telenius (with Finnish lyrics by Telenius as "Miljoona ruusua")
 1984: Finnish singer Katri Helena ("Miljoona ruusua")
 1984: Finnish singer Pirjo Suojanen ("Miljoona ruusua")
 1984: Hungarian singer Kata Csongrádi ("Millió rózsaszál")
 1985: Swedish dansband Vikingarna as ("Millioner Röda Rosor" with Swedish lyrics by the Russian speaking Swedish journalist Jacob Dahlin)
 1987: Japanese singer Tokiko Kato ("百万本のバラ", "Hyaku-man-bon no bara")
 1987: Finnish/Swedish singer Arja Saijonmaa (with Swedish lyrics by Lars Huldén as "Miljoner rosor")
 1988: Finnish band Santa Lucia ("Miljoona ruusua")
 1991 North Korean Pochonbo Electronic Ensemble singer Kim Kwang Suk ("백만송이 장미") 
 1997: South Korean singer Shim Soobong ("백만송이 장미", "Baegmansong-i Jangmi")
 1997: Russian singer Sergei Dikiy ("Million alykh roz")
 2001: Latvian/German singer Larisa Mondrusa ("Dāvāja Māriņa meitenei mūžiņu")
 2003: Russian/Swedish singer Elena Ermanova ("Million alykh roz")
 2006: Finnish singer Eero Aven ("Miljoona ruusua")
 2006: Vietnamese singer Gia Huy ("Triệu Đoá Hoa Hồng")
 2006: Latvian a cappella band Cosmos ("Million alykh roz")
 2008: Iranian singer Farzaneh ("Gole Roz")
 2009: Polish singer Magda Niewińska ("Milion Białych Róż")
 2011: South Korean singer Kim Jong-hyun ("백만송이 장미")
 2013: Ukrainian singer Ani Lorak ("Million alykh roz")
 2014: Vietnamese singer Hong Nhung ("Triệu Đoá Hoa Hồng")
 2019: Japanese enka singer Kiyoshi Hikawa ("百万本のバラ", "Hyaku-man-bon no bara") (both 2007 television performance as broadcast and 2019 CD Shin - Enka Meikyoku Collection 9: Daijôbu/Mogami no Sendô)
 2019: Cinemagic Studio from Ulaanbaatar, Mongolia created performance of this song in Mongolian
 Matti ja Teppo ("Miljoona ruusua")
 2018: Egor Kreed (Million alykh roz", with samples of this song, lyrics of was changed expect chorus)
 2020: Melo-M feat. Dināra Rudāne ("Dāvāja Māriņa")
 2021: Assyrian singer Madlen Ishoeva ("Million Warde Smooqe")

Performances 
 2011: The song was performed live by Ance Krauze at an event celebrating Raimonds Pauls's 75th birthday.
Korean band Infinity of Sound (song title: "백만송이 장미"). lyrics performance

References

Latvian songs
Russian songs
Soviet songs
Alla Pugacheva songs